Chelsea is a city in Washtenaw County in the U.S. state of Michigan. The population was 5,467 at the 2020 census.

History
The area was first settled as early as 1820 within the Michigan Territory by settler Cyrus Beckwith.  It would be organized as Sylvan Township in 1834.  The Michigan Central Railroad constructed a line through the area in 1848, and a post office was first established on January 4, 1849.  It was originally named Kendon. The name was changed to Chelsea on July 19, 1850 when the train station opened and community was formally platted.  The name Chelsea came from Elisha Congdon, who suggested the name after his hometown of Chelsea, Massachusetts.  Chelsea incorporated as a village in 1889.  The Chelsea courthouse is housed in a 120-year-old bank building in downtown.

The village of Chelsea incorporated into a city in 2004.  In 2011, the downtown area of Chelsea was listed on the National Register of Historic Places as the Chelsea Commercial Historic District.

Geography

The Border-to-Border Trail runs through the city.

Major highways
 forms the southernmost boundary of the city
 runs south–north through the center of the city.

Climate
This climatic region has large, varying seasonal temperature differences, with warm to hot (and often humid) summers and cold (sometimes severely cold) winters.   According to the Köppen Climate Classification system, Chelsea has a humid continental climate, abbreviated "Dfb" on climate maps.

Demographics

2010 census
As of the census of 2010, there were 4,944 people, 2,224 households, and 1,284 families living in the city. The racial makeup of the city was 96.1% White, 0.4% African American, 0.3% Native American, 1.1% Asian, 0.6% from other races, and 1.5% from two or more races. Hispanic or Latino of any race were 2.5% of the population.

There were 2,224 households, of which 28.1% had children under the age of 18 living with them, 46.2% were married couples living together, 8.8% had a female householder with no husband present, 2.8% had a male householder with no wife present, and 42.3% were non-families. 37.2% of all households were made up of individuals, and 21.9% had someone living alone who was 65 years of age or older. The average household size was 2.18 and the average family size was 2.91.

The median age in the city was 43.5 years. 22.7% of residents were under the age of 18; 4.7% were between the ages of 18 and 24; 24% were from 25 to 44; 25.9% were from 45 to 64; and 22.7% were 65 years of age or older. The gender makeup of the city was 45.5% male and 54.5% female.

2000 census
As of the census of 2000, there were 4,398 people, 1,840 households, and 1,133 families living in the village. The racial makeup of the village was 97.14% White, 0.70% African American, 0.27% Native American, 0.48% Asian, 0.07% Pacific Islander, 0.39% from other races, and 0.95% from two or more races. Hispanic or Latino of any race were 0.82% of the population.

There were 1,840 households, out of which 29.7% had children under the age of 18 living with them, 48.3% were married couples living together, 10.9% had a female householder with no husband present, and 38.4% were non-families. 35.4% of all households were made up of individuals, and 19.7% had someone living alone who was 65 years of age or older.  The average household size was 2.27 and the average family size was 2.95.

In the village the population was spread out, with 23.6% under the age of 18, 5.2% from 18 to 24, 25.0% from 25 to 44, 22.2% from 45 to 64, and 24.0% who were 65 years of age or older.  The median age was 43 years. For every 100 females, there were 82.9 males.  For every 100 females age 18 and over, there were 75.0 males.

The median income for a household in the village was $51,132, and the median income for a family was $72,266. Males had a median income of $50,506 versus $35,579 for females. The per capita income for the village was $27,609.  About 2.5% of families and 4.3% of the population were below the poverty line, including 2.9% of those under age 18 and 5.0% of those age 65 or over.

Economy

Chelsea Milling, maker of Jiffy Mix, is based in Chelsea. Other employers include Saint Joseph Mercy Chelsea, the Chrysler Proving Grounds, and the Special Alternative Incarceration Facility.

Education
The city is home to Chelsea School District, which also serves a very large area that includes portions of several neighboring townships.  Chelsea High School is located within the city.

The city is also served by Chelsea District Library.  In 2008, the library was named "Best Small Library in America" by Library Journal.

Notable people
Lynn Allen, NFL player
Dwight E. Beach, U.S. Army general and namesake of Beach Middle School
Jeff Daniels, actor of stage and screen. Founded the Purple Rose Theatre Company in Chelsea.
Laura Kasischke, National Book Critics Circle Award winner, poet, novelist
Tony Scheffler, professional football player for the Detroit Lions

Sister cities
Shimizu, Hokkaido, Japan

References

External links

City of Chelsea official website

 
Cities in Washtenaw County, Michigan
2004 establishments in Michigan
Populated places established in 2004